2nd Battalion, 14th Marines (2/14) is a reserve artillery battalion comprising three firing batteries and a headquarters battery.   The battalion headquarters is in Grand Prairie, Texas. In 2006 the battalion became the first fully operational HIMARS battalion in the Marine Corps. Fox Battery, based in Oklahoma City, Oklahoma. was deployed in July 2007 in support of Operation Iraqi Freedom, and has the distinction of being the first Marine Corps HIMARS battery to deploy into combat.

Mission
Augment and reinforce active Marine forces in time of war, national emergency or contingency operations.

Current units
 Headquarters Battery – Grand Prairie, Texas
 Battery D (Delta Battery) – El Paso, Texas
 Battery F (Fox Battery) – Oklahoma City, Oklahoma
 Battery K (Kilo Battery) – Huntsville, Alabama

History
The battalion was commissioned on 26 March 1943 at Marine Corps Base Camp Pendleton, California.  On 19 August 1943, 2/14 was assigned to the 14th Marine Regiment.  During January 1944, 2/14 was deployed to the Marshall Islands and participated in the following World War II Pacific campaigns: Battle of Kwajalein, Battle of Tinian and the Battle of Iwo Jima.  They were redeployed during October 1945 to Camp Pendleton, California and deactivated on 15 November 1945.

The 2/14 was reactivated on 1 July 1962 at NAS Dallas in Grand Prairie, Texas. In February 1966, 2/14 was assigned to the 4th Marine Division as part of Marine Forces Reserve.  They relocated to a standalone reserve facility near downtown Fort Worth, Texas in 1988. In March 2000 they returned to Grand Prairie, Texas at the Grand Prairie Armed Forces Reserve Complex.

The battalion participated in Operation Desert Shield and Operation Desert Storm, Southwest Asia, November 1990 – April 1991. 2/14 has additionally deployed batteries in support of Operation Iraqi Freedom and Operation Enduring Freedom including the second battle of Fallujah, Operation Phantom Fury.

Unit awards
A unit citation or commendation is an award bestowed upon an organization for the action cited. Members of the unit who participated in said actions are allowed to wear on their uniforms the awarded unit citation. 2nd Battalion, 14th Marines has been presented with the following awards:

See also

 List of United States Marine Corps battalions
 Organization of the United States Marine Corps

Notes

References

Bibliography

External links
 2/14's Official Website

4th Marine Division (United States)
Artillery battalions of the United States Marine Corps